La Salut is a Barcelona Metro station named after the neighbourhood of the same name where the station is situated, in Badalona municipality. It was opened on 18 April 2010 with the opening of the line from Gorg to Bon Pastor. It is served by TMB-operated Barcelona Metro line L10.

Layout
The station is located under the intersection of Avinguda del Marquès de Sant Morí and Salvador Seguí, Quevedo and Pau Piferrer streets. The station was built like many other new L9/L10 metro stations with a 22-meter depth well, this time however the well is not circular but it is square. It is divided in four levels: the upper hall, the pre-platform, the upper platform and the lower platform. The upper hall has four accesses from the street, all equipped with escalators and elevators, and making the station accessible. One of the accesses goes directly to the upper hall and the other accesses join it through a corridor. The upper hall has also ticket vending machines and a TMB Control Center. The upper platform is where run the trains toward La Sagrera and the lower platform is where run the trains toward Gorg. The architectural design of the station was designed by architect Alfons Soldevila Barbosa.

Gallery

References

External links

 The station listing at TMB website
 Information and photos about the station at Trenscat.com
 Photo gallery of Llefià and La Salut metro stations

Railway stations in Badalona
Barcelona Metro line 10 stations
Railway stations in Spain opened in 2010